The Anglican Church of the Holy Cross in Babcary, Somerset, England, was built in the 14th century. It is a Grade II* listed building.

History

The Church of the Holy Cross had its origins before the Norman Conquest, with a church being recorded in 1200. The fabric dates from the 14th and 15th centuries with the chancel and north aisle being added in the 19th century by Benjamin Ferrey in 1875–76. Further restoration was undertaken in the 1950s.

In 1764 James Woodforde, the author of The Diary of a Country Parson, was the curate at Babcary.

The parish is part of the Six Pilgrims benefice within the Diocese of Bath and Wells.

Architecture

The stone building has stone slate roofs. It consists of a two-bay chancel and three-bay nave with a north aisle. The three-stage tower is supported by corner buttresses. The tower contains a bell dating from 1753 and made by Thomas Bilbie of the Bilbie family.

Inside the church are a 14th-century font and octagonal pulpit dating from 1632.

See also  
 List of ecclesiastical parishes in the Diocese of Bath and Wells

References

Grade II* listed buildings in South Somerset
Grade II* listed churches in Somerset
Church of England church buildings in South Somerset